Geoff Bellingham (born 3 March 1976 in Lower Hutt, New Zealand) is a male badminton player from New Zealand. At the 1998 Commonwealth Games he won a bronze medal in the men's team event. Four years later at the 2002 Commonwealth Games he won a bronze medal in the mixed team event. He made his international debut in 1997.

References

1976 births
Living people
New Zealand male badminton players
Commonwealth Games bronze medallists for New Zealand
Badminton players at the 1998 Commonwealth Games
Badminton players at the 2002 Commonwealth Games
Badminton players at the 2006 Commonwealth Games
Sportspeople from Lower Hutt
Commonwealth Games medallists in badminton
21st-century New Zealand people
Medallists at the 1998 Commonwealth Games
Medallists at the 2002 Commonwealth Games